Tamriko Kvaliashvili (born 22 March 1991) is a Georgian footballer who plays as a forward. She has been a member of the Georgia women's national team.

References

1991 births
Living people
Women's association football forwards
Women's footballers from Georgia (country)
Georgia (country) women's international footballers